Viet Nguyen (February 25, 1981 – October 6, 2007) and Duc Nguyen (born February 25, 1981) were a pair of conjoined twins born in Vietnam and surgically separated in 1988. Viet died in 2007 of natural causes.

Viet and Duc were born on February 25, 1981, in Kon Tum Province, Tây Nguyên, Vietnam. Viet was the elder and Duc was the younger of the two brothers. Their relatives claim that "the reason they became conjoined twins is the influence of Agent Orange that the U.S. military used as a defoliant during the Vietnam War". Their mother was farming in an area doused with Agent Orange a year after the Vietnam War had ended. She also drank water from a well in that area. After that, Viet and Duc were born. On October 4, 1988, Viet and Duc were separated in the hospital in Ho Chi Minh City with the help of the Japanese Red Cross after Viet went into a coma.

Duc first entered junior high school, then dropped out and learned computer programming in a school. Now, he works at a hospital in Ho Chi Minh City. On December 16, 2006, he married Nguyen Thanh Tuyen in Ho Chi Minh City.

Viet's health problems continued after the separation, and he died due to liver failure and pneumonia on October 6, 2007, at the age of 26.

See also 
 Conjoined twins
 Vietnam War
 Agent Orange

References

External links 
 
 

1981 births
2007 deaths
Conjoined twins
Vietnamese people with disabilities
People from Kon Tum Province